An inverted sentence is a sentence in a normally subject-first language in which the predicate (verb) comes before the subject (noun).

Down the street lived the man and his wife without anyone suspecting that they were really spies for a foreign power.
Because there is no object following the verb, the noun phrase after the verb "lived" can be decoded as subject without any problem.
In English, such an inversion often introduces do-support.

Examples
Inversion after initial negatives:
Never again will you do that.
Never a day had she missed her lessons.
Rarely have I eaten better food.
Hardly ever does he come to class on time.
Not until a frog develops lungs does it leave the water and live on the land.
Not only was Mary famous for helping escaped slaves, but she was also the first African Canadian woman to establish a newspaper.
Hardly ever have there been so many choices for young people entering the work force as there are today.
Mourn them do not. Miss them do not.

Inversion after other structures:
Up jumped the frog.
So high is Mount Everest that climbers can take only a couple of steps per minute as they near the summit.
Off the coast of North Carolina lie the Barrier Islands, a popular summer resort area.
Only after the earthquake had taken place did the lack of safety measures become obvious.

References

See also 
V2 word order
Grammar